Federal is a city in the province of Entre Ríos, Argentina. It lies in the center-north of the province, by National Route 127, about 190 km northeast of the provincial capital Paraná.

The basis of the local economy is the production of citrus and crops of wheat and soybean. The city has hosted the annual National Festival of Chamamé since 1976.

The town was officially founded on 7 September 1880 by provincial governor . The creation and shaping of the first institutions of this settlement was due to a Spanish immigrant, Antonio Flores.

Federal is the exact antipode of the Chinese city of Shanghai, the third most populous city in the world.

References

External links
 
 Federal at EntreRiosTotal.com.

Populated places in Entre Ríos Province
Populated places established in 1880
1880 establishments in Argentina